Eliezer ben Solomon Ashkenazi was a Rabbi and Talmudical scholar born in Poland about the beginning of the 19th century, who resided afterward in Tunis. He published at Metz in 1845, under the title Dibre Hakamim ("Words of [the] Wise"), a selection of 11 ancient manuscripts:

 Midrash Wayosha, on the Pentateuch
 Joseph Caro's Commentary on Lamentations
 Maimonides' Hokmat ha-'Ibbur, a treatise on the computation of the intercalary month
 Abraham bar Hiyyah's seventh "gate" of the third treatise on the computation of the intercalary month, with a responsum by Hai Gaon on the calculation of the years since the Creation
 Moses Narboni's Maamar ba-Behirah, a treatise on free-will
 Nussah Ketab, a letter from Joshua Lorki on religion
 Isaac Ardotiel's Meliẓah 'al ha-'Et, a prose poem on the pen
 David ben Yom-tob's Yesodot ha-Maskil, 13 articles of belief of an enlightened man
 RaMBaM, a letter from Maimonides addressed to Rabbi Japhet the Dayyan
 A letter by Elijah of Italy, written from Palestine to his family at Ferrara, in 1438
 Jacob Provençal's Be-Debar Limmud ha-Hokmah, on the study of science.

S. Munk has written an introduction to this collection, which contains also, as an appendix, a French translation of Yesodot ha-Maskil by "H. B."

Ashkenazi published also Ta'am Zekenim ("Taste [of] Old Men"), edited by R. Kirchheim, a collection of old manuscripts and prints dealing with Jewish literature and history in the Middle Ages (Frankfort-on-the-Main, 1854).

References 
 Its bibliography:
Joseph Zedner, Cat. Hebr. Books Brit. Mus. pp. 56, 57;
William Zeitlin, Bibliotheca Hebraica, p. 7.

19th-century Tunisian rabbis
19th-century Polish rabbis
19th-century Polish scholars